Marlboro County is a county located in the Pee Dee region on the northern border of the U.S. state of South Carolina. As of the 2020 census, its population was 26,667. Its county seat is Bennettsville. The Great Pee Dee River runs through it. Marlboro County comprises the Bennettsville, SC Micropolitan Statistical Area.

Marlboro County is home to the Pee Dee Indian Tribe. They are a relatively small American Indian tribe that has occupied the Pee Dee region for several centuries. The tribe was officially recognized by the Government of South Carolina around the beginning of the 21st Century, they have been seeking federal acknowledgment since 1976. While today the tribe consists of just over 200 enrolled members, they were once a significant cultural and political power in the region. Their profound influence and continual presence in the area is why the region bears the Pee Dee name. Since 1976, the tribe's official seat of government has operated on land awarded to the tribe in Marlboro County.

History
Succeeding indigenous peoples occupied this area for thousands of years. At the time of European encounter, the inhabitants of the area were the Pee Dee. Though nearly wiped out by European settlers, the Pee Dee Indian Tribe was able to survive centuries of war, disease, slavery and oppression, and has continued to maintain a presence in the area.

In the 1960s and early 1970s, researchers identified numerous sites in South Carolina and the Southeast that they associated with what they have classified as South Appalachian Mississippian culture. The settlements developed about AD 1000, later than did some of the largest settlements to the northwest that were closer to the Mississippi River and its tributaries.

Town Creek Indian Mound, a National Historic Landmark located across the border in present-day Montgomery County, North Carolina, is a surviving platform mound and archeological village site of this Pee Dee culture. It was occupied about 200 years and abandoned after AD 1150, for unknown reasons.  In 2017, the Pee Dee Indian Tribe officially began work on the Pee Dee Tribal Mounds located on tribal land in McColl.

European colonization and later history
The first European colonists to arrive in the area were Welsh settlers, part of the British Isles colonists who migrated south from Pennsylvania. In 1737, they established the first European-American settlement, called Welsh Neck. These settlers organized a Baptist church in January 1738.

The South Carolina Welsh settlement consisted of 173,000 acres granted exclusively to Welsh settlers in 1737 by an act of the South Carolina Assembly.  Within a decade, nearly all of this land had been taken and settled in by Welsh immigrants, the majority of whom were Baptists.  They immigrated to what is now Marlboro County, South Carolina from existing Welsh settlements in Delaware and Pennsylvania as well as directly from Wales.  The European settlement along the Peedee River from area around Poston and Gresham, South Carolina all the way to the area around McFarlan, North Carolina was exclusively Welsh between the 1730s and the 1780s.

On 12 March 1785, Marlboro County was established by the South Carolina General Assembly according to its powers as described in the 1778 Constitution of the State of South Carolina during the American Revolution. It was named for the Duke of Marlborough. The nascent county remained part of what was then known as Cheraws District until 1798, then in 1800 Marlboro became a district itself. Under the 1868 Constitution of the State of South Carolina, passed during the Reconstruction era, South Carolina districts became counties with home rule, where the legislative representatives from each county had additional powers as councillors of their county.

The first courthouse was built near the Great Pee Dee River, just north of Crooked Creek, in a village called Carlisle, named for Richard Carlisle.

To establish a central location for the county court, the state legislature designated Bennettsville, founded in 1819, as the new county seat. Construction for a courthouse, designed by Robert Mills, began in 1820. and was completed in 1824. It was replaced in the later 19th century. The second courthouse was expanded and renovated in 1953–1954.

Geography

National protected area 
 Great Pee Dee River Heritage Preserve Wildlife Management Area (part)

Major water bodies 
 Crooked Creek
 Great Pee Dee River
 Lake Wallace

Adjacent counties 

 Richmond County, North Carolina - north
 Scotland County, North Carolina - northeast
 Robeson County, North Carolina - east
 Dillon County - east
 Florence County - south
 Darlington County - southwest
 Chesterfield County - west
 Anson County, North Carolina - northwest

Transportation

Airports 
 Marlboro County Jetport
 Myrtle Beach International Airport (MYR) 76.8 Miles South - South - East of Bennettsville
 Charlotte International Airport (CLT) 81.3 Miles West - North - West of Bennettsville
 Clio Crop Care Airport (9W9)

Major highways 
  (Concurrency with US 501)

Demographics

2020 census

As of the 2020 United States census, there were 26,667 people, 9,613 households, and 6,069 families residing in the county.

2010 census
At the 2010 census, there were 28,933 people, 10,383 households, and 6,903 families in the county. The racial makeup of the county was 50.9% black or African American, 41.4% white, 4.5% American Indian, 0.3% Asian, 1.1% from other races, and 1.8% from two or more races. Those of Hispanic or Latino origin made up 2.8% of the population. In terms of ancestry, and 9.7% were American.

Of the 10,383 households, 33.5% had children under the age of 18 living with them, 36.8% were married couples living together, 24.3% had a female householder with no husband present, 33.5% were non-families, and 30.0% of households were made up of individuals. The average household size was 2.47 and the average family size was 3.06. The median age was 38.8 years.

The median household income was $27,688 and the median family income  was $32,485. Males had a median income of $31,170 versus $24,885 for females. The per capita income for the county was $13,817. About 23.3% of families and 27.5% of the population were below the poverty line, including 40.4% of those under age 18 and 17.6% of those age 65 or over.

2000 census
At the 2000 census there were 28,818 people, 10,478 households, and 7,334 families in the county.  The population density was 60 people per square mile (23/km2). There were 11,894 housing units at an average density of 25 per square mile (10/km2).  The racial makeup of the county was 50.73% Black or African American, 44.49% White, 3.36% Native American, 0.24% Asian, 0.24% from other races, and 0.95% from two or more races. 0.71% of the population were Hispanic or Latino of any race.
Of the 10,478 households 32.00% had children under the age of 18 living with them, 42.60% were married couples living together, 22.20% had a female householder with no husband present, and 30.00% were non-families. 26.90% of households were one person and 11.00% were one person aged 65 or older.  The average household size was 2.59 and the average family size was 3.14.

The age distribution was 26.20% under the age of 18, 9.30% from 18 to 24, 29.40% from 25 to 44, 22.80% from 45 to 64, and 12.30% 65 or older.  The median age was 35 years. For every 100 females there were 96.30 males.  For every 100 females age 18 and over, there were 93.10 males.

The median household income was $26,598 and the median family income  was $32,019. Males had a median income of $25,896 versus $20,590 for females. The per capita income for the county was $13,385.  About 17.70% of families and 21.70% of the population were below the poverty line, including 29.20% of those under age 18 and 22.70% of those age 65 or over.

Government and politics 
After Democrats regained power in the state in the late nineteenth century, the legislature passed a new constitution that raised barriers to voter registration, effectively disfranchising black voters; at the time blacks comprised a majority of the population in the state and mostly supported Republican candidates. The state legislature also imposed legal racial segregation and laws for Jim Crow and white supremacy. This situation of disfranchisement lasted largely into the 1960s, until after Congress passed the federal Voting Rights Act of 1965, to give the government oversight and power to enforce constitutional rights for all citizens. As part of the Solid South, the whites of the county and state used to vote overwhelmingly Democratic, giving 100% of its vote to the party in 1924. White South Carolina residents (and throughout the South) had outsize power in Congress, as they controlled seats apportioned on the basis of total population of the state, while disfranchising the blacks.

Since the late 20th century, the county has voted mostly Democratic, but the demographics of political alignments have changed markedly since the 19th century. African Americans have mostly left the Republican Party to support the national Democratic Party. Conservative whites have shifted to the Republican Party. In the 1972 election, Republican Richard Nixon won every county in the state including Marlboro. In state and local voting, many whites have voted for Republican candidates, and African Americans have tended to continue to support the Democrats.

The Democratic presidential candidates have received more than 58% of the county vote in all elections from 1992 to 2012.

Communities

Cities
 Bennettsville (county seat and largest city)
 Cheraw (mostly in Chesterfield County)

Towns
 Blenheim
 Clio
 McColl
 Tatum

Census-designated places
 Wallace

See also
 List of counties in South Carolina
 National Register of Historic Places listings in Marlboro County, South Carolina
 Wildlife management area

References

Further reading

External links

 
 

Marlboro County, South Carolina
1785 establishments in South Carolina
Populated places established in 1785
Majority-minority counties in South Carolina